Pilate and Others is a 1972 German drama film directed by Andrzej Wajda, based on the 1967 novel The Master and Margarita by the Soviet writer Mikhail Bulgakov, although it focuses on the parts of the novel set in biblical Jerusalem.

The film has the subtitle Ein Film für Karfreitag because it was released on March 29, 1972, on the eve of Easter.   It was also shown at the Berlin Film Festival on February 15, 2006, when director Andrzej Wajda received an Honorary Golden Bear.

Background
Andrzej Wajda had already received two scripts from Warsaw to make a movie about the Passion but he had rejected both of them. When he had read The Master and Margarita, he decided to use Mikhail Bulgakov’s dialogues for his film.

The shootings were done in Nuremberg, on the ruines of the Derde Rijk. Wajda used the platform, from which Adolf Hitler held his speeches when he was addressing the Nazi Party in Nuremberg.

Story
In the novel The Master and Margarita by the Russian author Mikhail Bulgakov, on which the film is based, three story lines are interwoven: a satirical story line in which Satan, called Woland here, goes to the city of Moscow in the 30s to deal in hilarious manner with the corrupt lucky ones, bureaucrats and profiteers from the Stalin era, a second one describing the internal struggle fought by Pontius Pilate before, during and after the conviction and execution of Yeshua Ha Nozri (Jesus from Nazareth), and a third one telling the story of the love between the master, an unnamed writer in Moscow during the 30s and his beloved Margarita, which goes to the extreme to save her master. The master has written a novel about Pontius Pilate, and is addressed by the authorities because this was an issue which in the officially atheistic Soviet Union was taboo.

The film Pilate and Others only tells the biblical story of the novel: the story of Pontius Pilate and Yeshua Ha Nozri (Jesus from Nazareth),

Differences from the novel
The biblical story of the novel is situated in Jersjalajim, but Wajda transferred it to Germany in the present time. Levi Matvei is a modern TV reporter who makes reports from Golgotha; Yeshua Ha-Nozri passes Way of the Cross on streets of Frankfurt am Main.

Cast

Wojciech Pszoniak as Yeshua Ha-Nozri
Jan Kreczmar as Pontius Pilate
Daniel Olbrychski as Levi Matvei
Andrzej Lapicki as Aphranius
Marek Perepeczko as Marcus
Jerzy Zelnik as Judah of Kiriaf
Vladek Sheybal as Caiaphas
Andrzej Wajda as reporter

Soundtrack
Johann Sebastian Bach - Matthäus-Passion

Other screen adaptations of The Master and Margarita
Giovanni Brancale - Il Maestro e Margherita - 2008 (film)
Vladimir Bortko - Master i Margarita - 2005 (TV series)
Ibolya Fekete - A Mester és Margarita - 2005 (film)
Sergey Desnitsky - Master i Margarita - 1996 (film)
Yuri Kara - Master i Margarita - 1994 (film)
Paul Bryers - Incident in Judea - 1991 (tv-film)
Oldřich Daněk - Pilát Pontský, onoho dne - 1991 (film)
Andras Szirtes - Forradalom Után - 1990 (film)
Aleksandr Dzekun  - Master i Margarita - 1989 (tv-reeks)
Maciej Wojtyszko - Mistrz i Małgorzata - 1988 (TV series)
Vladimir Vasilyev and Boris Yermolaev - Fuete - 1986 (film)
Aleksandar Petrović - Il Maestro e Margherita - 1972 (speelfilm)

To be expected
Scott Steindorff - The Master and Margarita - 2012 (film)
Rinat Timerkaev - Master i Margarita - 2012 (animation film)

References

External links 

1972 films
Films based on works by Mikhail Bulgakov
German television films
Films directed by Andrzej Wajda
1972 drama films
Films based on Russian novels
Portrayals of Jesus on television
1970s German-language films
ZDF original programming